The Lake is a Canadian comedy television series created by Julian Doucet for Amazon Prime Video. The series is Amazon's first scripted Canadian Amazon Original series, and premiered on June 17, 2022. In advance of the official series premiere, the first two episodes received a preview screening at the 2022 Inside Out Film and Video Festival. In July 2022, the series was renewed for a second season.

Premise 
After returning from abroad following a break-up with his long-term partner, Justin plans to connect with his teenage daughter he gave up for adoption. His plans to make new memories with his daughter at the family cottage go awry when he discovers his parents left it to his picture-perfect step-sister, Maisy-May.

Cast

 Jordan Gavaris as Justin, a gay man returning from abroad to reconnect with his birth daughter Billie. In an effort to bond with Billie, Justin brings her to the lake where he spent most of his childhood summers.
 Julia Stiles as Maisy-May: Justin's picture-perfect step-sister. Conniving and ambitious, Maisy inherited the family's lake cabin from her stepfather, much to Justin's surprise and dismay.
 Madison Shamoun as Billie: Justin's city-loving teenage birth daughter whom he gave up for adoption. Billie is mixed race as her mother is a Black woman and her father white.
 Jared Scott as Killian, Maisy and Victor's eldest son and love interest of Billie. Like Billie, Killian is mixed race and has some understanding of what it feels like to be an outsider.
 Terry Chen as Victor Lin, a Chinese Canadian ex-pro hockey player, married to Maisy-May. Like his wife, Victor is ambitious and shows no hesitation to manipulate those around him to ensure his family succeeds.
 Travis Nelson as Riley, a gay man who is Justin's love interest, is a local artist, handyman, and store operator.
 Natalie Lisinska as Jayne, friend and sometime minion of Maisy, who has been passively bullying Maisy since their teen years.
 Jon Dore as Wayne, Jayne's often clueless husband. Wayne is immature and a man-child but has genuine affection for his wife and daughters.
 Carolyn Scott as Ulrika, a cabin owner of Swedish descent who grows marijuana that she shares with some community members.
 Declan Whaley as Opal Lin, Maisy and Victor's younger child who is gender-queer and finds himself identifying with Justin.

Episodes

Production

Development 
In early August 2021, Amazon ordered its first scripted Canadian Amazon Original series, The Lake. Julian Doucet serves as writer and executive producer, with Michael Souther and Teza Lawrence also executive producing under their production company Amaze Film + Television. In May 2022, Jordan Canning and Paul Fox were revealed as directors. On July 13, 2022, Amazon renewed the series for a second season.

The plot is based in part on the real-life experiences of series creator Julian Doucet.

Casting 
With the series announcement, Jordan Gavaris, Julia Stiles, and Madison Shamoun were cast as the leads. Jon Dore, Carolyn Scott, Natalie Lisinska, Travis Nelson, Declan Whaley, and Terry Chen were also cast. Lauren Holly as Mimsy, Max Amani, and Jhaleil Swaby have joined the second season.

Filming 
Filming began on August 5, 2021 in North Bay, Ontario, Canada. Filming wrapped on September 1, 2021. The second season began production on August 15, 2022 and wrapped on September 29, 2022 in North Bay, Ontario.

Release 
The Lake premiered on Amazon Prime Video on June 17, 2022.

References

External links 
 

2022 Canadian television series debuts
2020s Canadian sitcoms
English-language television shows
Amazon Prime Video original programming
Television shows filmed in North Bay, Ontario
Television series about adoption
Television series about vacationing
2020s Canadian LGBT-related comedy television series